The Washakie Formation is a geologic formation in northern Colorado and southern Wyoming. It preserves many mammal, bird, reptile and other fossils dating back to the Lutetian stage of the Eocene within the Paleogene period. The sediments fall in the Bridgerian and Uintan stages of the NALMA classification.

Fossil content 
The Washakie Formation has provided many fossil mammals, turtles and other reptiles, birds and other fossils.

The artiodactyl Heliosus apophis was described from the formation by Burger and Jolley, and the rodents Pareumys flynni, Pauromys turnbulli and Thisbemys intermedius by Korth in 2020.

Mammals

Reptiles

See also 
 List of fossiliferous stratigraphic units in Wyoming
 Paleontology in Wyoming
 Bridger Formation
 Green River Formation
 Uinta Formation
 Wasatch Formation

References

Bibliography

Further reading 

 W. G. Joyce, V. S. Volpato, and Y. Rollot. 2018. The skull of the carettochelyid turtle Anosteira pulchra from the Eocene (Uintan) of Wyoming and the carotid canal system of carettochelyid turtles. Fossil Record 21:301-310
 N. Vitek. 2011. Insights into the Taxonomy and Systematics of North American Eocene Soft-Shelled Turtles from a Well-Preserved Specimen. Bulletin of the Peabody Museum of Natural History 52(2):189-208
 S. M. McCarroll, J. J. Flynn, and W. D. Turnbull. 1996. Biostratigraphy and magnetostratigraphy of the Bridgerian-Uintan Washakie Formation, Washakie Basin, Wyoming. In D. R. Prothero and R. J. Emry (eds.), The Terrestrial Eocene-Oligocene Transition in North America 25-39
 R. K. Stucky, D. R. Prothero, W. G. Lohr and J. R. Snyder. 1996. Magnetic stratigraphy, sedimentology, and mammalian faunas of the early Uintan Washakie Formation, Sand Wash Basin, northwestern Colorado. In D. R. Prothero and R. J. Emry (eds.), The Terrestrial Eocene-Oligocene Transition in North America 40-51
 S. M. McCarroll, J. J. Flynn, and W. D. Turnbull. 1996. The Mammalian Faunas of the Washakie Formation, Eocene Age, of Southern Wyoming. Part III. The Perissodactyls. Fieldiana, Geology 33:1-38
 A. Wetmore. 1944. A new terrestrial vulture from the Upper Eocene deposits of Wyoming. Annals of Carnegie Museum 30:57-69
 R. Zangerl. 1944. Brachyuranochampsa eversolei, gen. et sp. nov., a new crocodilian from the Washakie beds of Wyoming. Annals of Carnegie Museum 30:77-84
 O. P. Hay. 1908. The fossil turtles of North America. Carnegie Institution of Washington Publication 75:1-568

Geologic formations of Colorado
Geologic formations of Wyoming
Paleogene geology of Wyoming
Paleogene Colorado
Eocene Series of North America
Lutetian Stage
Bridgerian
Uintan
Sandstone formations of the United States
Fluvial deposits
Paleontology in Colorado
Paleontology in Wyoming